Punt Kanon is a point at the extreme southeast of the Caribbean island of Curaçao in the Netherlands Antilles. It lies in Oostpunt, and immediately to the east of a small lagoon. A lighthouse stands on Punt Kanon.

See also
 List of lighthouses in Curaçao

References

External links
 Picture of Punt Kanon Lighthouse

Geography of Curaçao
Lighthouses in Curaçao
Buildings and structures in Curaçao